Pseudolaguvia kapuri is a species of catfish from India and Nepal.

Etymology
The fish is named in honor of the entomologist A. P. Kapur, who was the Director of the Zoological Survey of India.

References

Talwar, P.K. and A.G. Jhingran, 1991. Inland fishes of India and adjacent countries. Volume 2. A.A. Balkema, Rotterdam. 

Catfish of Asia
Fish of India
Taxa named by Raj Tilak
Taxa named by Akhlaq Husain
Fish described in 1975
Erethistidae